Terry Bidiak (born 20 June 1945) is a Canadian former soccer player who played as a midfielder.

Career 
Bidiak played at the youth level with Toronto Ukraina, and played with the senior team in 1960 in the National Soccer League. In 1964, he played at the college levelwith Michigan State University. In 1967, he signed a contract with Detroit Cougars of the United Soccer Association. In 1971, he signed with the Toronto Metros of the North American Soccer League. In July, 1971 the Metros loaned Bidiak to the Toronto Hellas of the National Soccer League. He shortly was recalled back to play with the Metros as the club experienced a player shortage due to inquires. He played in three matches for the Toronto Metros.

International career 
Bidiak was called up by the Canada men's national soccer team in 1968, but failed to make an appearance for the national team.

References  
 

Living people
1945 births
Association football defenders
Canadian soccer players
Toronto Ukrainians players
Detroit Cougars (soccer) players
Toronto Blizzard (1971–1984) players
Canadian National Soccer League players
North American Soccer League (1968–1984) players
Canadian people of Ukrainian descent